Toni Dathe-Fabri was a German screenwriter and occasional actress active during the film industry's silent era.

Selected filmography 

 Wiener Herzen (1930)
 Freiheit in Fesseln (1930)
 Man schenkt sich Rosen, wenn man verliebt ist (1930)
 Jugendsünden (1929)
 Rinaldo Rinaldini (1927)
 Die Elenden der Straße (1926)
 Der kleine Herzog (1924)
 Bigamie (1922)
 Entblätterte Blüten (1920)
 Das Grauen (1920)
 Dem Teufel verschrieben (1919)
 Im Dienste der Liebe (1919) 
 Eine tolle Kiste (1919)
 Mary Wood, die Tochter des Sträflings (1919)
 Erste Liebe: wahre Liebe (1918)
 Christa Hartungen (1917)
 Der Tolle Dammingen (1917)
 Der Schloßschrecken (1916)
 Ullas Weg (1916)

References 

Silent film screenwriters
German women screenwriters
German screenwriters
Year of birth missing
Year of death missing